Thomas Hannan may refer to:

 Thomas Hannan (Virginia settler) (1757–1835), American settler and Revolutionary War soldier
 Thomas Hannan (activist) (1950–1991), opera singer and HIV/AIDS activist
 Tommy Hannan (born 1980), American Olympic gold medal-winning swimmer